Sir Ivor Llewellyn Brace (September 1898 – 24 October 1952) was a Welsh soldier and barrister who later served as a colonial judge. In 1951, he became the first Chief Justice of the Combined Judiciary of Sarawak, North Borneo and Brunei. He served in this position until his death.

Career 
Ivor was called to the Bar in England and Wales in 1921 and practised on the South Wales circuit. His first appointment with the Colonial Legal Service was as magistrate in the Gold Coast. In 1932, Ivor was Crown Counsel in Colonial Nigeria. He later served as assistant judge at the Nigerian High Court before being transferred to Sierra Leone Colony and Protectorate to serve as puisne judge.

In 1946, Ivor left for British Borneo after being appointed Chief Justice of North Borneo and subsequently became the first Chief Justice of the Combined Judiciary of Sarawak, North Borneo and Brunei in December 1951. He was knighted in the 1952 New Year Honours.

Personal life 
Brace was the younger of two sons of William Brace and Nellie Humphreys.

Honours 
  :
  Knight Bachelor (Kt) - Sir (1952)

References 

"Sir Ivor's Estate", Singapore Standard, 6 April 1953, p. 3.

1898 births
1952 deaths
People from Abertillery
Colonial Nigeria judges
Sierra Leone Colony and Protectorate judges
British Borneo judges
Sarawak, North Borneo and Brunei judges
British colonial governors and administrators in Africa
British colonial governors and administrators in Asia
Welsh barristers
Welsh soldiers
British colonial army officers
Welch Regiment soldiers
Royal Welch Fusiliers soldiers
British Army personnel of World War I
Knights Bachelor
Colonial Legal Service officers